The Kraków School of Mathematics and Astrology was an influential mid-to-late-15th-century group of mathematicians and astrologers at the University of Kraków (later Jagiellonian University).

Notable members
 Jan of Głogów (1445–1507), author of widely recognized mathematical and astrological tracts
 Marcin Biem (1470–1540), contributor to the Gregorian calendar
 Marcin Bylica of Olkusz (1433–93), later court astrologer to King Matthias Corvinus of Hungary
 Albert Brudzewski (1446–1495), teacher to notable scholars active at European universities
 Marcin Król of Żurawica (1422–1460)
 Nicolaus Copernicus (1473–1543), student at Kraków in 1491–95

See also
 Kraków School of Mathematics
 Polish School of Mathematics

References
 

History of education in Poland
Education in Kraków
History of mathematics
Jagiellonian University
Polish mathematics
Astrological organizations